James Tullis Logie (23 November 1919 – 30 April 1984) was a Scottish footballer.

Career

Born in Edinburgh and raised in the city's Grassmarket, Logie first played for Scottish junior side Lochore Welfare, before being signed by London giants Arsenal in June 1939. Soon afterwards World War II broke out, and Logie was called up; he served in the Royal Navy for the entire duration of the conflict, guesting for hometown St Bernards, Dunfermline Athletic and Grimsby Town when his service permitted. In 1940, he made a guest appearance, scoring once, for Southampton.

After being demobbed he rejoined Arsenal, playing several wartime matches, before making his full first-team debut against Wolves on 31 August 1946. Logie was a talented and creative player (many observers likened him to his fellow countryman Alex James, who had played for Arsenal in the 1930s), and for the next eight seasons he was a regular in the Arsenal side, playing at inside forward. He took part in all of Arsenal's early post-war successes; Arsenal won two First Division titles in 1947–48 and 1952–53, and the 1949–50 FA Cup – Logie set up both goals in a 2–0 win over Liverpool in the final. In the latter stages of his career he also served as Arsenal vice-captain, behind Joe Mercer.

Despite his success at Arsenal, Logie only ever won a single a cap for Scotland, playing against Northern Ireland on 5 November 1952. In all he played 328 matches for Arsenal, scoring 76 goals. He left the Gunners in February 1955, joining non-league Gravesend & Northfleet, helping them win the 1957-58 Southern League championship and lasting there until 1960.

After retirement Logie fell on hard times; football was not the lucrative profession it is currently, He eventually ended up working in a newsagents in Piccadilly Circus. He died in 1984, aged 64.

Honours
Arsenal
First Division: 1947–48 & 1952–53
FA Charity Shield: 1948, 1953
FA Cup: 1950

Gravesend & Northfleet
Southern League Championship: 1958

References

1919 births
1984 deaths
Footballers from Edinburgh
Scottish footballers
Scotland international footballers
Arsenal F.C. players
Southampton F.C. wartime guest players
Ebbsfleet United F.C. players
English Football League players
Grimsby Town F.C. wartime guest players
Association football inside forwards
St Bernard's F.C. wartime guest players
Dunfermline Athletic F.C. wartime guest players
Lochore Welfare F.C. players
FA Cup Final players
Royal Navy personnel of World War II